Gyori is a surname. Notable people with the surname include:

Arpád Györi (born 1970), Czech ice hockey player and coach
Ferenc Győri (born 1964), Hungarian ultramarathon runner and geographer
János Győri (born 1976), Hungarian footballer
Ladislao Pablo Győri (born 1963), Argentine-Hungarian engineer, digital and visual artist, essayist and poet
Mátyás Győri (born 1997), Hungarian handballer
Noemi Győri (born 1983), Hungarian classical flautist